This event was held on Saturday January 31, 2009 as part of the 2009 UCI Cyclo-cross World Championships in Hoogerheide, Netherlands.

Ranking

Notes

External links
 Union Cycliste Internationale

Men's under-23 race
UCI Cyclo-cross World Championships – Men's under-23 race
2009 in cyclo-cross